Maria Hsia is a political figure who was convicted in early 2001, by a Federal District Court. She was found guilty of laundering donations to the Democratic National Committee by the Hsi Lai Buddhist Temple in Hacienda Heights, California, during the 1996 U.S. presidential election. The judge, Paul Friedman, denied a request from the U.S. Department of Justice that Ms. Hsia should serve prison time, and instead sentenced her to 90 days' home detention, probation, a fine, and community service.

Born in Taiwan, Hsia came to the United States as a student in 1973 and received a permanent resident visa in 1975. Originally, she worked for immigration law firms in Los Angeles. In 1982, Hsia began fund-raising for political candidates in state and local races. In 1988, her work for then California Lt. Gov. Leo McCarthy's Senate campaign introduced Hsia to national politics. She eventually became a fundraiser for the Democratic National Committee.

See also
Gandhi Memorial International Foundation

References

External links
Suro, Roberto, "Gore's Ties to Hsia Cast Shadow on 2000 Race", Washington Post, February 23, 1998
Eskenazi, Michael, "For both Gore and GOP, a guilty verdict to watch", CNN.com, March 3, 2000
Senate Governmental Affairs Committee's Majority Report Executive Summary, Washington Post, March 8, 1998

Date of birth missing (living people)
Living people
1996 United States presidential election
People convicted of money laundering
Taiwanese emigrants to the United States
Year of birth missing (living people)